Lara Robinson (born 1 January 1998) is an Australian actress who has appeared in films, television series, and theatre productions.

Career
Robinson has appeared in a remake of a 1978 Australian thriller Long Weekend starring Claudia Karvan as well as an American science fiction drama, Knowing, starring Nicolas Cage and Rose Byrne.  She has also made guest television appearances on television series such as City Homicide and Elephant Princess. Robinson joined the cast of Winners & Losers in 2012 as student Tilly Young.

She is also a musician and dancer.

Filmography

Films

Television

References

External links

 https://web.archive.org/web/20141023170403/http://lara-robinson.com/

Living people
1998 births
Australian film actresses
Australian stage actresses
Australian television actresses
Australian child actresses
21st-century Australian actresses